Morigi may refer to:

 Morigi language, a language of Papua New Guinea
 Morigi, an Italian surname; notable people include:
 Guillermo Morigi (born 1974), Argentine football player
 Renzo Morigi (1895–1962), Italian sports shooter
 Roger Morigi (1907–1995), Italian-born American sculptor

Italian-language surnames